A nacelle  is a cover housing that houses all of the generating components in a wind turbine, including the generator, gearbox, drive train, and brake assembly.

A notable feature now found on some off-shore wind turbines is a large sturdy helicopter-hoisting platform built on top of the nacelle, capable of supporting service personnel and their tools, winched down to the platform from a helicopter hovering above it. Wind turbine rotors are stopped, feathered and locked before personnel are dropped down to or picked up from the platforms.

References 

Wind turbines